Pa Benedict Odiase (August 25, 1934 – June 11, 2013) was a Nigerian composer who composed "Arise, O Compatriots," the national anthem of Nigeria. "Arise, O Compatriots," which was adopted in 1978, replaced the country's previous national anthem, "Nigeria, We Hail Thee".

Odiase was born in 1934, and raised in British Nigeria, where Edo State is now. He served in the Nigerian Police Force from 1954 to 1992 and was also the Music Director of the Nigerian Police Band and the MId-West State Police Band. He was awarded the Order of the Niger in December 2001.

Odiase died from a short illness on June 11, 2013, at the age of 78.

References

1934 births
2013 deaths
Nigerian composers
National anthem writers